There are at least four main types of competitive pigeon sport:

 Pigeon racing
 Tumbling
 Highflying
 Tippler (Endurance)

Though not quite a sport, fancy breeds of pigeons are also bred to standards and judged in a competitive fashion. Levi in his book The Pigeon describes all aspects of pigeon keeping. For exhibition purposes sport pigeons are sometimes grouped as Flying/Sporting Pigeons.

References

See also 
Birmingham Roller
List of pigeon breeds